The 2009 IFA Shield was an association football tournament organised by the Indian Football Association. Most of the teams came from the I-League 1 & 2, with  AS Douanes (Dakar) invited from Senegal and Tata Football Academy qualifying by winning the Prodyut Dutta Memorial Trophy. The Shield was won by Churchill Brothers SC.

The teams were divided into 4 groups of 3 teams each. The winner of each group will qualify for the semifinals. The tournament started on 30 August and the final was played on 12 September. ESPN televised the two semifinals and final live from the Yuba Bharati Krirangan in Saltlake.

The probable venues would be Mohun Bagan ground, East Bengal ground, Howrah Municipal Stadium, Barasat Stadium and Kalyani Municipal Stadium.

Groups

 Tata Football Academy won a thrilling Prodyut Dutta Memorial Trophy final against West Bengal Police to qualify for the 114th IFA Shield.
 Viva Kerala withdrew from the tournament due to failure to register players on time.

Tables and results

Group A

Group B

Group C

Group D

Semi-finals

Final

References

2009 domestic association football cups
2009
2009–10 in Indian football